The National Honor Society (NHS) is a nationwide organization for high school students in the United States and outlying territories, which consists of many chapters in high schools. Selection is based on four criteria: scholarship (academic achievement), leadership, service, and character. The National Honor Society requires some sort of service to the community, school, or other organizations. The time spent working on these projects contributes towards the monthly service hour requirement. The National Honor Society was founded in 1921 by the National Association of Secondary School Principals. The Alpha chapter of NHS was founded at Fifth Avenue High School by Principal Edward S. Rynearson in Pittsburgh, Pennsylvania.

National Honor Society groups are commonly active in community service activities both in the community and at the school. Many chapters maintain a requirement for participation in such service activities.

In addition, NHS chapters typically elect officers, who, under the supervision of the chapter adviser, coordinate and manage the chapter as a student organization.

Membership
Over one million students are estimated to participate in the National Honor Society. NHS and NJHS chapters are found in all 50 states, the District of Columbia, Puerto Rico, many U.S. territories, and Canada. They can also be found in areas of Asia; Pakistan has three schools, each maintaining an active chapter. Furthermore, they can be found in international and American schools throughout the globe.

Motto 
The NHS motto is noblesse oblige (French: "nobility obligates"). The Dictionnaire de l'Académie française defines it thus:
 Whoever claims to be noble must conduct himself nobly.
 (Figuratively) One must act in a fashion that conforms to one's position, and with the reputation that one has earned.

Scholarship 
Since 1946, the National Honor Society has given out more than US$15 million in scholarship awards. In the 2018-19 school year, 600 awards were to be distributed, including 1 National Winner ($25,000), 24 national finalists ($5,625 each), and 575 national semifinalists ($3,200 each).

Parent and sister organizations
 National Association of Secondary School Principals
 National Junior Honor Society
 National Elementary Honor Society
 National Student Council

See also
Arista – National Honor Society
German National Honor Society
French National Honor Society
Spanish National Honor Society
Mu Alpha Theta
International Thespian Society
National Art Honor Society
National Beta Club
National Technical Honor Society
Quill and Scroll
Tri-M

References

External links
 National Honor Society
 National Junior Honor Society
 National Elementary Honor Society
 National Association of Secondary School Principals

1921 establishments in Pennsylvania
Student organizations established in 1921
Youth organizations based in Virginia
School terminology
Honor societies